GNUMail is a free and open-source, cross-platform e-mail client based on GNUstep and Cocoa. It is the official mail client of GNUstep and is also used in Étoilé. It was inspired by NeXTMail (NeXT's Mail.app), the predecessor of Apple Mail. GNUMail is based on the mail handling framework Pantomime.  GNUMail demonstrated that it is possible to develop cross platform programs for GNUstep and Cocoa.

Features
Supported protocols: POP3 (with APOP support), IMAP4 and UNIX; SMTP
Supports TLS with all protocols
Mail spool file support for receiving
File formats for local saving: Maildir, Berkeley mbox
Filters for incoming and outgoing mail which support regular expressions
Thread Arcs for email thread visualization and navigation
Find Panel supporting regular expressions
Ability to add custom mailheaders
Native support for PGP/GPG encryption

See also

Comparison of email clients

References

External links
GNUMail User Guide for Version 1.0pre1.
GNUMail.app - GNUstepWiki 

Email client software for Linux
MacOS email clients
Free email software
Unix Internet software
Portable software
Free software programmed in Objective-C
Software that uses GNUstep